Atte Engren (born 19 February 1988) is a Finnish former professional ice hockey goaltender. He is currently the goaltending coach of Lukko U18 in the U18 SM-sarja, the top-tier under-18 junior league in Finland.

Playing career 
After spending his whole career in his hometown team Lukko, Engren signed a contract with TPS Turku in 2008. Engren is a hybrid butterfly goalie by style. Engren was drafted as 204th overall by the Nashville Predators in the 2007 NHL Entry Draft and signed a two-year entry-level contract with the organization on 28 May 2010 after winning the 2010 Finnish championship with TPS. While in North America, he did not see any playing time in the NHL, but made 27 appearances for Nashville's AHL affiliate Milwaukee Admirals in the 2010–11 and 2011–12 season. He returned to TPS for the 2012–13 campaign and on 8 May 2013, Engren signed with HC Lev Praha of the KHL.

On 2 July 2014, Engren left Lev Praha, after it declared bankruptcy and folded, as a free agent to sign with fellow KHL club, Atlant Moscow Oblast where he spent the 2014–15 season. He then played for fellow KHL side HC Spartak Moscow in 2015–16 before moving to Sweden: He signed with Leksands IF of the Swedish Hockey League (SHL) in June 2016.

International play
Engren played on the Finland team in the 2015 IIHF Ice Hockey Championship.

References

External links
 

1988 births
Living people
Atlant Moscow Oblast players
Finnish expatriate ice hockey players in Russia
Finnish expatriate ice hockey players in Sweden
Finnish expatriate ice hockey players in the United States
Finnish ice hockey goaltenders
HIFK (ice hockey) players
Hokki players
Kiekko-Vantaa players
Leksands IF players
HC Lev Praha players
Lukko players
Milwaukee Admirals players
Nashville Predators draft picks
People from Rauma, Finland
Sportspeople from Satakunta
HC TPS players
TuTo players
Finnish expatriate ice hockey players in the Czech Republic
HC Spartak Moscow players